Mendel can be both a surname and given name. Mendel is mostly a Yiddish variant and affectionate form of the Hebrew name Menachem  and means "comforter".

List
Notable people with the name include:

Given name
Mendel Jackson Davis (1942–2007), American attorney and politician from South Carolina
Mendel Gdański, fictional character from short story by Maria Konopnicka
Mendel Portugali (1888–1917), leading figures in Second Aliya and founder of the Hashomer movement
Mendel Rosenblum (born 1962), American associate professor of computer science
Mendel Sachs (1927–2012), American theoretical physicist and professor
Mendel Shapiro, Jewish lawyer and Modern Orthodox Rabbi
Mendel Weinbach (1933–2012), Orthodox rabbi
Mendel Zaks (1898–1974), rabbi, Rosh Yeshiva in Raduń Yeshiva
 Rabbi Menachem Mendel Schneerson, the Rebbe of Chabad
 Rabbi Menachem Mendel Scheerson, The Tzemach Tzedek, the third Rebbe of Chabad

Surname
 Andrei Mendel (born 1995), Russian football midfielder
 Arthur Mendel (1905–1979), American musicologist
 August Neander (1789–1850), German theologian (born David Mendel)
 Barry Mendel, American film producer
 Gérard Mendel (1930–2004), French psychoanalyst and psychiatrist
 Gregor Mendel (1822–1884), often called the "father of genetics"
 Henriette Mendel (1833–1891), German actress and mistress
 Iuliia Mendel (born 1986), Ukrainian journalist
 J. Michael Mendel (1964–2019), American television producer
 Lafayette Mendel (1872–1935), American biochemist
 Nate Mendel (born 1968), American musician

See also
Mandel
Mendelsohn 
Mendelssohn 
Menachem Mendel
 Mendel (Hungarian family), a prominent Hungarian family that flourished in the 15th century.

Surnames
Jewish surnames
Yiddish-language surnames
Yiddish masculine given names

fr:Mendel